Raven Shamira Goodwin is an American actress. She made her debut with the comedy film Lovely & Amazing (2001), which earned her an Independent Spirit Award nomination, and next received a Screen Actors Guild Award nomination for her role in the drama film The Station Agent She made her shift to television roles starring in the Nickelodeon comedy series Just Jordan (2007–2008).

In 2010, Goodwin transitioned to mature roles with the series Huge (2010), and subsequently came to mainstream recognition with a recurring role on the sitcom Good Luck Charlie (2010–2014). Her widespread breakthrough came with a leading role on the BET series Being Mary Jane (2013–2019), for which her performance received praise. She has since appeared as Eliza on the comedy series SMILF (2017–2019) and as Denise Clark-Bradford in the television film The Clark Sisters: First Ladies of Gospel (2020), the latter of which earned her a Black Reel Award nomination. She made her return to film with a cameo in the action film Snatched (2017).

Early and personal life 
Goodwin was born in Washington D.C. In 2019, Goodwin announced her engagement to finance executive Wiley Battle, through Instagram, which was picked up across various media outlets. In 2020, they welcomed their first child, a daughter.

Acting career

2001–2008: Child acting 
Goodwin began acting in 2001, making her debut with the comedy drama film Lovely & Amazing, starring as Annie Marks. Goodwin's performance was praised, leading her to receive a number of award nominations for the role, of which includes a Black Reel Award nomination and an Independent Spirit Award. The New York Times wrote on her performance that "Of the three daughters, Annie (Goodwin) seems the most grounded", and Empire magazine named Goodwin a "stand-out" of the film.

In 2003, Goodwin was cast in Tom McCarthy's independent comedy-drama The Station Agent as Cleo. Filmed over a strain of time in the same year, The Station Agent and the performances of the ensemble were acclaimed upon release. She earned a Screen Actors Guild Award nomination for the role, which ranks her among the youngest actresses to be nominated. On Goodwin's acting, Roger Ebert, who previously reviewed Lovely & Amazing, said that she "like (Peter) Dinklage, has a particular and unshakable presence on the screen, and I hope the movies do not misplace her, as they do so many child actors."

In 2004, Goodwin began working on television, making guest appearances on various shows, of which include the sitcom Malcolm in the Middle, and the television series Strong Medicine and Everybody Hates Chris. In 2006, Goodwin appeared in the critically-panned comedy film Phat Girlz as Young Jazmin Biltmore. Goodwin landed the main role of Tangie Cunningham on Nickelodeon sitcom Just Jordan, which began airing in 2007, running for two seasons.

2009–present: Mainstream breakthrough 
In 2010, Goodwin was cast in the main role of Becca in the sitcom Huge, which ran for a season. The show averaged roughly a million viewers per episode. Later that year, Goodwin was cast as the recurring role of Ivy Wentz in Disney Channel sitcom Good Luck Charlie. Following this, Goodwin played the role of Sheila on Fox's comedy drama Glee for three episodes, and appeared as Desiree in American sitcom New Girl. Her role on Good Luck Charlie earned particular praise.

In 2013, Goodwin was cast in the main role of Niecy Patterson, the niece of Gabrielle Union's character, in the American drama series Being Mary Jane, which she played until the show ended in 2019. Being Mary Jane polarized critics and audiences, and broke records for the BET network, and gave Goodwin recognition in mature roles. On the transition from Disney, she said that "it was very necessary. At one point I was doing Disney and Being Mary Jane at the same time. But it still felt natural. It still felt organic." She played the role until 2019, a period of time in which she sporadically took television and film roles.

In 2017, she was cast in the role of Eliza in the American television program SMILF; she was initially set to portray a recurring role, though she was promoted to a series regular for the show's second season. The series ran for 2 years, and was cancelled following several misconduct allegations made by SMILF's cast and crew against Frankie Shaw. In spite of this, SMILF obtained widespread acclaim throughout its run, and received a Golden Globe Award nomination. Goodwin had a minor role in the 2017 action-comedy film Snatched as Lew.

In 2019, Goodwin starred in the BET television film Christmas Belles. In the same year, she was cast as Denise Clark-Bradford in the Lifetime television film The Clark Sisters: First Ladies of Gospel. Released in 2020, the feature was Lifetime's most-watched in four years, and Goodwin's acting was lauded by critics; she received a nomination for another Black Reel Award.

In January 2021, Goodwin portrayed actress Hattie McDaniel in the independent biographical film Behind the Smile. On being cast in the role, Goodwin stated that "I am forever honored. I look forward to bringing this important historical and relevant life story to the screen." In August of that same year, Goodwin began playing the recurring character of Josephine on the drama series Our Kind of People.

Filmography

Film

Television

Awards and nominations

References

External links
 
 

Living people
21st-century American actresses
Actresses from Washington, D.C.
African-American actresses
American child actresses
American film actresses
American television actresses
21st-century African-American women
21st-century African-American people
Year of birth missing (living people)